Arnott Whitney (born November 16, 1931) was a Canadian professional hockey player who played for the Hershey Bears in the American Hockey League. He also played for the Victoria Cougars and Winnipeg Warriors in the Western Hockey League, and the Quebec Aces in the Quebec Hockey League. He later worked as an inspector for the Government of Ontario.

References

External links
 

1931 births
Living people
Hershey Bears players
People from Miramichi, New Brunswick
Ice hockey people from New Brunswick
Winnipeg Warriors (minor pro) players
Canadian ice hockey defencemen